Penicillium columnare is a fungus species of the genus of Penicillium.

See also
List of Penicillium species

References

columnare
Fungi described in 1930
Taxa named by Charles Thom